The Revolutionary Front for an Independent East Timor (abbreviated as Fretilin) is a centre-left political party in East Timor. They presently hold 23 of 65 seats in the National Parliament. Fretilin formed the government in East Timor until their independence in 2002. They obtained the presidency in 2017 under Francisco Guterres, but lost in the 2022 East Timorese presidential election.

Fretilin began as a resistance movement that fought for the independence of East Timor, originally from Portugal in 1974 and later from Indonesia until 1999. After East Timor gained its independence in 2002, Fretilin became one of several parties competing for power in a multi-party system.

History before independence

Ascendancy and destruction 
Fretilin was founded on 20 May 1974 as the Timorese Social Democratic Association (ASDT). The ASDT renamed itself to Fretilin on 11 September 1974 and took a more radical stance, proclaiming itself the “sole legitimate representative” of the East Timorese people. In response to a coup by the Timorese Democratic Union (UDT) on 11 August 1975, Fretilin hastily formed an armed wing called Falintil, which emerged victorious after a three week civil war. Falintil would continue to wage war against the Indonesian military during its invasion on 7 December 1975 and ensuing occupation.

Fretilin formally declared East Timor's independence from Portugal on 28 November 1975 and inaugurated an 18-member cabinet with members of the Fretilin Central Committee with Xavier do Amaral as president and Nicolau dos Reis Lobato as both vice president and prime minister. The two men fell out as the pressures from the occupation escalated, and in September 1977 Lobato had do Amaral arrested for "high treason". On 13 December 1978, Lobato, do Amaral's successor as president, was killed by the Indonesian forces. He was succeeded by Mau Lear, who served until he was also tracked down and executed by Indonesian forces on 2 February 1979.

Fretilin came under enormous pressure in the late 1970s. From September 1977 to February 1979, only 3 of the 52 members of Fretilin's Central Committee survived.

Recuperation and national unity
Fretilin survived despite the military collapse, and was slowly rebuilt under the relatively moderate and nationalist leadership of Xanana Gusmão.

Between March 1981 and April 1984 Fretilin was known as Partido Marxista–Leninista Fretilin (PMLF), and Marxism-Leninism was officially declared the party's ideology. The name was changed back in 1984 and its revolutionary politics abandoned in order to further national unity and acquire the support of the UDT and the Catholic Church.

History since independence
In the first elections, held in 2001, the year before independence, Fretilin polled 57.4% of the vote and took 55 seats in the 88-seat Assembly. While this gave the party a working majority, it fell short of the two-thirds majority it had hoped for to dictate the drafting of a national constitution.

In the June 2007 parliamentary election, Fretilin again took first place, but with a greatly reduced 29% of the vote and 21 seats. In the election it faced a challenge from the National Congress for Timorese Reconstruction (CNRT), led by former president Xanana Gusmão, which placed second. Although Fretilin did not win a majority of seats, its Secretary-General, Mari Alkatiri, spoke of forming a minority government. The party formed a national unity government which included the CNRT, a collaboration that they had previously rejected.

However, subsequent talks between the parties were unsuccessful in reaching an agreement on a government. After weeks of dispute between the CNRT-led coalition and Fretilin over who should form the government, José Ramos-Horta announced on 6 August that the CNRT-led coalition would form the government and that Gusmão would become Prime Minister. Fretilin denounced Ramos Horta's decision as unconstitutional, and angry Fretilin supporters in Dili immediately reacted to Ramos-Horta's announcement with violent protests. Alkatiri said that the party would fight the decision through legal means and would encourage people to protest and practice civil disobedience. A few days later, Fretilin Vice-President Arsénio Bano said that the party would not challenge the government in court, and expressed a desire for a "political solution" leading to the creation of a national unity government.

Francisco Guterres of Fretilin served as president of East Timor from 2017 to 2022. Guterres sought re-election to a second term in 2022, but lost to José Ramos-Horta. The CNRT was in power from 2007 to 2017, but Fretilin Secretary-General Mari Alkatiri formed a coalition government after the July 2017 parliamentary election. However, his new minority government soon fell, resulting in a second general election in May 2018, which the CNRT won as part of the 2017–2020 coalition the Alliance for Change and Progress (AMP).

Electoral history

Presidential elections

Legislative elections

See also 
 :Category:Fretilin politicians

References

Political parties in East Timor
East Timorese nationalism
Indonesian occupation of East Timor
Democratic socialist parties in Asia
Left-wing nationalist parties
Progressive Alliance
Former member parties of the Socialist International
1970s establishments in East Timor
1974 establishments in Southeast Asia
Political parties established in 1974
1970s in Portuguese Timor
National liberation movements
Rebel groups in Indonesia
Separatism in Indonesia